Paul Leonard Kogeldans (born 28 June 1930), known as Leo Kogeldans, is a former Surinamese footballer and manager who has played for V.V. Ajax and S.V. Voorwaarts in the Surinamese Hoofdklasse, and for VVV-Venlo in the Dutch Eredivisie. He also played for the Suriname national team. After his career he was manager of Dutch amateur club V.C.H.

He is the father of former professional footballer Ruben Kogeldans.

Career

VV Ajax
Kogeldans was born in the Frimangron neighborhood of Paramaribo, Suriname, a neighborhood known for producing top athletes. He began his football career playing on the Mr. Bronsplein where he was picked up by V.V. Ajax, playing in the Hoofdklasse. Ajax played barefoot at the time, and Kogeldans soon became known for his dribbling skills and goal scoring abilities. The top clubs in the country were eager to sign the young player, but it was talent scout Frits Juda who had convinced Kogeldans to sign with S.V. Voorwaarts instead.

SV Voorwaarts
Kogeldans joined SV Voorwaarts at age 18. He was an affective goal scorer, scoring a hat-trick in a 6-5 win against MVV in his first year with the club. In 1949 he was called up for the Suriname national team based on his performance. He helped Voorwaarts to win two national championships in 1952 and in 1957, before departing for the Netherland.

VVV-Venlo
In 1957, Kogeldans relocated to Venlo, Netherlands signing with VVV-Venlo. He scored another hat-trick in his first match with the club in a friendly against German club TSV 1860 München. Kogeldans went on to play two full seasons with VVV, helping the club to a 7th-place finish on the league table in both seasons. He was the first footballer of the African diaspora to play professionally for VVV-Venlo.

International career 
Kogeldans made his debut for the Suriname national team in 1949. He made a total 15 appearances for the first team before departing for the Netherlands.

Managerial career
After his playing career Kogeldans managed Dutch amateur club V.C.H. (Voetbal Club Horsterweg) from Venlo.

Personal life
On 7 February 1957, Kogeldans married Eveline Pinas, having four children together. His son Ruben Kogeldans played professional football for VVV-Venlo and Willem II before his untimely death on 7 June 1989 aboard the Surinam Airways Flight 764 which crashed during approach to Paramaribo.

Honours

Club
S.V. Voorwaarts
 SVB Hoofdklasse (2): 1952, 1957

References 

Living people
1930 births
Sportspeople from Paramaribo
Surinamese footballers
Suriname international footballers
S.V. Voorwaarts players
VVV-Venlo players
SVB Eerste Divisie players
Eredivisie players
Surinamese expatriate footballers
Surinamese expatriate sportspeople in the Netherlands
Surinamese emigrants to the Netherlands
Association football forwards